Derby of Jordan refers to the football derbies between the professional Jordanian clubs Al-Faisaly and Al-Wehdat from the capital Amman. Al-Faisaly and Al-Wehdat are the most successful clubs in the history of the Jordanian league, both teams serve as the main recruiting pools for Jordan national team.

Background
Matches between the rival teams have a long history of violence, mirroring the divisions between the country's majority Palestinians and native Jordanians, mostly tribes who inhabited the East Bank of the Jordan River before the displacement of Palestinians after the creation of Israel in 1948.

The most serious incident occurred in December 2010 when Al-Wehdat defeated Al-Faisaly 1–0 at the final whistle with Faisaly fans throwing stones over the stands while leaving the stadium, Wehdat fans trying to escape the ground desperately were mistaken for an out-of-control hooligan crowd by police, and clashes occurred. The fans eventually broke down the fence separating the stands from the pitch, then broke free. Though sometimes thought to be a racist rivalry with much sectarian hatred between Jordanians and Palestinians, it truly is just a popularity contest of the two greatest teams in Jordan, with the mass success fueling the passion, hatred and emotion. Due to the two-horse race nature of the league, it has been like that for a very long time. 250 supporters were injured in supporter related violence when the Palestinian supported Wehdat played against Al-Faisaly, supported by Jordanians.

The matches between the two teams have had supporters chanting slogans from the civil war, the war between the Jordanian state and the Palestinian resistance movement, in 1970. Jordanian Palestinians have recently subdued their nationalist slogans at the stadiums.

List of results

Head to head
This table explains the all-time record of official meetings between the two teams since 28 November 1976:

Trophies 
Comparison of Al-Faisaly and Al-Wehdat trophies won:

See also
List of association football rivalries
Palestinians in Jordan
Black September in Jordan

References

Association football rivalries
Football in Jordan
Sport in Amman